Frank Rosolino (August 20, 1926 – November 26, 1978) was an American jazz trombonist.

Biography
Rosolino was born in Detroit, Michigan, United States, He performed with the big bands of Bob Chester, Glen Gray, Tony Pastor, Herbie Fields, Gene Krupa, and Stan Kenton. After a period with Kenton he settled in Los Angeles, where he performed with Howard Rumsey's Lighthouse All-Stars (1954–1960) in Hermosa Beach.

Throughout the 1960s and 1970s, between nightclub engagements, Rosolino was active in many Los Angeles recording studios where he performed with such notables as Frank Sinatra, Sarah Vaughan, Tony Bennett, Peggy Lee, Mel Tormé, Michel Legrand, and Quincy Jones. In the mid-to-late 1960s he and fellow trombonist Mike Barone, billed as "Trombones Unlimited," recorded for Liberty Records several albums of pop-style arrangements of current hits, such as the 1968 album Grazing in the Grass.  He can also be seen performing with Shelly Manne's group in the film I Want to Live! (1958) starring Susan Hayward, and also in Sweet Smell of Success (1957) with Burt Lancaster and Tony Curtis. He was a regular on The Steve Allen Show and a guest artist on The Tonight Show and The Merv Griffin Show. Rosolino was a talented vocalist, renowned for his wild form of scat-singing, notably on Gene Krupa's hit record, "Lemon Drop".

During the 1970s, Rosolino performed and toured with Quincy Jones and the Grammy Award winning group Supersax.

Rosolino's private life was highly troubled. On November 26, 1978, Rosolino shot both of his sons as they slept. One died instantly; the other survived, but was blinded. Rosolino shot himself in the head immediately after shooting his sons and died.

Discography

As leader
 Frank Rosolino (Capitol, 1954)
 Frankly Speaking (Capitol, 1955)
 I Play Trombone (Bethlehem, 1956)
 Frank Rosolino Quintet (Mode, 1957)
 Turn Me Loose! (Reprise, 1961)
 Jazz a Confronto 4 (Horo, 1973)
 Conversation with Conte Candoli (RCA Victor, 1976)
 Just Friends with Conte Candoli (MPS, 1977)
 Thinking About You (Sackville, 1984)
 Free for All (Speciality, 1986)
 The Last Recording (Sea Breeze, 2006)

As sideman
With Francy Boland
 Blue Flame (MPS/BASF 1976)
 Red Hot (MPS, 1977)
 White Heat (MPS, 1978)

With June Christy
 Fair and Warmer! (Capitol, 1957)
 June's Got Rhythm (Capitol, 1958)
 June Christy Recalls Those Kenton Days (Capitol, 1959)
 Do-Re-Mi (Capitol, 1961)
 Big Band Specials (Capitol, 1962)
 Impromptu (Interplay, 1977)

With Terry Gibbs
 Launching a New Band (Mercury, 1959)
 The Exciting Terry Gibbs Big Band (Verve, 1961)
 Explosion! (Mercury, 1962)

With Quincy Jones
 The Hot Rock OST (Prophesy, 1972)
 Body Heat (A&M, 1974)
 Mellow Madness (A&M, 1975)
 I Heard That!! (A&M, 1976)

With Stan Kenton
 New Concepts of Artistry in Rhythm (Capitol, 1953)
 Popular Favorites by Stan Kenton (Capitol, 1953)
 Sketches on Standards (Capitol, 1953)
 This Modern World (Capitol, 1953)
 Portraits on Standards (Capitol, 1953)
 Kenton Showcase (Capitol, 1954)
 The Kenton Era (Capitol, 1955)

With Skip Martin
 Scheherajazz (Pye/Golden Guinea 1959)
 Songs and Sounds from the Era of the Untouchables (Somerset 1960)
 Perspectives in Percussion Vol. 1 (Somerset/Stereo-Fidelity, 1961)
 Perspectives in Percussion Vol. 2 (Somerset/Stereo-Fidelity, 1961)

With Shorty Rogers
 Shorty Rogers Plays Richard Rodgers (RCA Victor, 1957)
 Portrait of Shorty (RCA Victor, 1958)
 Afro-Cuban Influence (RCA Victor, 1958)
 The Wizard of Oz and Other Harold Arlen Songs (RCA Victor, 1959)
 Shorty Rogers Meets Tarzan (MGM, 1960)
 The Swingin' Nutcracker (RCA Victor, 1960)
 An Invisible Orchard (RCA Victor, 1997)

With Pete Rugolo
 Music for Hi-Fi Bugs (EmArcy, 1956)
 Out on a Limb (EmArcy, 1957)
 An Adventure in Sound: Brass in Hi-Fi (Mercury, 1958)
 Percussion at Work (EmArcy, 1958)
 Rugolo Plays Kenton (EmArcy, 1958)
 The Music from Richard Diamond (EmArcy, 1959)
 Behind Brigitte Bardot (Warner Bros., 1960)
 10 Trombones Like 2 Pianos (Mercury, 1961)
 The Original Music of Thriller (Time, 1961)

With Howard Rumsey's Lighthouse All-Stars
 Vol. 6 (Contemporary, 1955)
 Lighthouse at Laguna (Contemporary, 1956)
 Volume Three (Contemporary, 1956)
 Music for Lighthousekeeping (Contemporary, 1957)
 Double or Nothin'  (Liberty, 1957)
 In the Solo Spotlight! (Contemporary, 1957)
 Jazz Rolls Royce (Lighthouse, 1958)
 Jazz Structures (Philips, 1961)

With Supersax
 Supersax Plays Bird with Strings (Capitol, 1975)
 Chasin' the Bird (MPS, 1977)
 Dynamite!! (MPS, 1979)

With Mel Torme
 Mel Torme, Swings Shubert Alley (Verve, 1960)
 Mel Torme, I Dig the Duke/I Dig the Count (Verve, 1962)
 Mel Torme, A Day in the Life of Bonnie and Clyde (Liberty, 1968)

With others
 Steve Allen, Steve Allen Plays Bossa Nova Jazz (Dot, 1963)
 Georgie Auld, In the Land of Hi-Fi with Georgie Auld and His Orchestra  (EmArcy/Mercury, 1956)
 Georgie Auld, The Georgie Auld Quintet Plays the Winners (Philips, 1963)
 Chet Baker, Chet Baker Big Band (Pacific Jazz, 1957)
 Jesse Belvin, Mr. Easy (RCA, 1960)
 Louie Bellson, Louie Rides Again! (Percussion Power 1974)
 Betty Bennett, Nobody Else But Me (Atlantic, 1955)
 Max Bennett, Max Bennett (Bethlehem, 1955)
 Max Bennett, Max Bennett Plays (Bethlehem, 1956)
 Elmer Bernstein, The Man with the Golden Arm OST (Decca, 1956)
 Harry Betts, The Jazz Soul of Doctor Kildare (Choreo, 1962)
 Brass Fever, Brass Fever (Impulse!, 1975)
 Buddy Bregman, Swinging Kicks (Verve, 1957)
 Buddy Bregman, Swingin' Standards (World Pacific, 1959)
 Les Brown, Jazz Song Book (Coral, 1960)
 Salvador Camarata, Camarata Featuring Tutti's Trombones (Coliseum, 1966)
 Frank Capp, Percussion in a Tribute to Henry Mancini (Kimberly, 1961)
 Keith Carradine, I'm Easy (Asylum, 1976)
 Benny Carter, Jazz Giant (Contemporary, 1958)
 Benny Carter, Aspects (United Artists, 1959)
 Ray Charles, At the Club (Philips, 1966)
 Buddy Collette, Jazz Loves Paris (Specialty, 1960)
 Bob Cooper, Coop! The Music of Bob Cooper (Contemporary, 1958)
 Alexander Courage, Hot Rod Rumble (Liberty, 1957)
 Paulinho da Costa, Agora (Pablo, 1977)
 Jackie Davis, Jackie Davis Meets the Trombones (Capitol, 1959)
 Frances Faye, Frances Faye in Frenzy (Verve, 1961)
 Victor Feldman, Vic Feldman on Vibes(Mode, 1957)
 Victor Feldman, Latinsville! (Contemporary, 1964)
 The Four Freshmen, Four Freshmen and 5 Trombones (Capitol, 1955)
 Gerald Fried, Dino (Epic, 1957)
 Curtis Fuller, J. J. Johnson, Frank Wess, The Trombone Album (Savoy, 1980)
 Russell Garcia, Four Horns and a Lush Life (Bethlehem, 1956)
 Dizzy Gillespie, The New Continent (Limelight, 1965)
 Benny Golson, Killer Joe (Columbia, 1977)
 Chico Hamilton, Sweet Smell of Success (MCA, 1973)
 Richard Harris, The Yard Went On Forever (Dunhill, 1968)
 Bill Holman, In a Jazz Orbit (Andex, 1958)
 Bill Holman, Bill Holman's Great Big Band (Capitol, 1960)
 Paul Horn, Jazz Suite On the Mass Texts (RCA Victor, 1965)
 Helen Humes, Helen Humes (Contemporary, 1960)
 Jackie and Roy, Free and Easy! (ABC-Paramount, 1958)
 Richie Kamuca & Bill Holman, Jazz Erotica (HiFi, 1957)
 Barney Kessel, Let's Cook! (Contemporary, 1962)
 Gene Krupa, Drummin' Man (Columbia, 1963)
 Gene Krupa, 1949 (Alamac, 1974)
 Peggy Lee, Let's Love (Atlantic, 1974)
 Stan Levey, This Time the Drum's On Me (Bethlehem, 1956)
 Stan Levey, Grand Stan (Bethlehem, 1957)
 Johnny Mandel, I Want to Live (United Artists, 1958)
 Shelly Manne, My Fair Lady with the Un-original Cast (Capitol, 1964)
 Shelly Manne,  Manne–That's Gershwin! (Capitol, 1965)
 Charlie Mariano, Mariano (Bethlehem, 1955)
 Charlie Mariano, Charlie Mariano Plays (Bethlehem, 1956)
 Harvey Mason, Marching in the Street (Arista, 1975)
 Sergio Mendes, Homecooking (Elektra, 1976)
 Don Menza, First Flight (Catalyst, 1977)
 Gerry Mulligan, The Jazz Combo from I Want to Live! (United Artists, 1958)
 Gerry Mulligan, Nightwatch (United Artists, 1961)
 Tommy Newsom, Live from Beautiful Downtown Burbank (Direct-Disk, 1978)
 Lennie Niehaus, Zounds! (Contemporary, 1958)
 Anita O'Day, Cool Heat (Verve, 1959)
 Anita O'Day, Trav'lin' Light (Verve, 1961)
 Tom Ranier, Ranier (Warner Bros., 1976)
 Buddy Rich, This One's for Basie (Norgran, 1956)
 Johnny Richards, Something Else by Johnny Richards (Bethlehem, 1956)
 Lee Ritenour, First Course (Epic, 1976)
 Max Roach and Stan Levey, Drummin' the Blues (Liberty, 1958)
 Howard Roberts, Something's Cookin'  (Capitol, 1965)
 Moacir Santos, Maestro (Blue Note, 1972)
 Lalo Schifrin, Gone with the Wave (Colpix, 1965)
 Lalo Schifrin, Jazz Suite on the Mass Texts (RCA Victor, 1965) 
 Bud Shank, Girl in Love (World Pacific, 1966)
 Cybill Shepherd, Mad About the Boy (Inner City, 1980)
 Ben Sidran, Puttin' in Time On Planet Earth (Blue Thumb, 1973)
 Horace Silver, Silver 'n Brass (Blue Note, 1975)
 Horace Silver, Silver 'n Wood (Blue Note, 1976)
 Zoot Sims, Zoot Sims (Vogue, 1973)
 Zoot Sims, Hawthorne Nights (Pablo, 1977)
 Frank Sinatra, Ring-a-Ding Ding! (Reprise, 1961)
 Joanie Sommers, For Those Who Think Young (Warner Bros., 1962)
 Joanie Sommers, The Voice of the Sixties! (Warner Bros., 1961)
 Sonny Stitt, Sonny Stitt Plays Jimmy Giuffre Arrangements (Verve, 1959)
 Sonny Stitt, I Remember Bird (Catalyst, 1977)
 Frank Strazzeri, Taurus (Revelation, 1973)
 Frank Strazzeri, Frames (Glendale, 1975)
 Cal Tjader, Huracan (Crystal Clear, 1978)
 Tower of Power, Back to Oakland (Warner Bros., 1974)
 Bobby Troup, Bobby Troup and His Stars of Jazz (RCA Victor, 1959)
 Sarah Vaughan, Orchestra Arranged and Conducted by Michel Legrand (Mainstream, 1973)
 Tommy Vig, Encounter with Time (Discovery, 1977)
 Joe Williams, With Love (Temponic, 1972)

References

External links
 Frank Rosolino at Jazz Masters
 Frank Rosolino at Trombone Page of the World
 Frank Rosolino – 1926–1978 ...  musical montage via Jazz Profiles blog 10/17/09 poignant posting

1926 births
1978 suicides
American jazz trombonists
Male trombonists
Cass Technical High School alumni
Musicians from Detroit
Murder–suicides in California
Suicides by firearm in California
Bebop trombonists
American people of Italian descent
American jazz musicians
American murderers
20th-century American musicians
20th-century trombonists
Jazz musicians from Michigan
20th-century American male musicians
American male jazz musicians
Sackville Records artists
Capitol Records artists
1978 deaths